The Tutuvén River is a river in Chile.

See also
List of rivers of Chile

References

Rivers of Chile